Haunted Forest may refer to:
 Haunted Forest (2007 film), an American horror film
 Haunted Forest (2017 film), a Filipino supernatural horror film